Juraj Križko (born 20 September 1985) is a Slovak football defender who plays amateur football for Trenčianske Stankovce.

External links

1985 births
Living people
Slovak footballers
Association football defenders
AS Trenčín players
MŠK Púchov players
Slovak Super Liga players
Czech First League players
2. Liga (Slovakia) players
FC Zbrojovka Brno players
Slovak expatriate sportspeople in the Czech Republic
Expatriate footballers in the Czech Republic
FK Senica players
FC Hradec Králové players
FC Nitra players
People from Ilava
Sportspeople from the Trenčín Region
Slovak expatriate footballers